Akeem Latifu (born 16 November 1989 in Kano) is a retired Nigerian footballer.

Career

Club
Latifu began his career for Bussdor United F.C. and signed a contract for Ocean Boys in January  2009 . After a half-year who earned 17 caps left Ocean Boys F.C. and signed for Nigeria Premier League rival Akwa United F.C. in January 2010. On 9 August 2013 he signed a loan-contract with Aalesund.

On 21 January 2017, Latifu signed a 1.5-year contract with Azerbaijan Premier League side Zira FK.

On 26 July 2017, Latifu signed for Budapest Honvéd. His contract expired in November 2017 and he became a free agent.

On 19 February 2018, Latifu signed a 2-year contract with OBOS-ligaen club Sogndal. He left the club on 18 December 2018 by mutual termination.

In March 2022 it was reported that he had joined English side Hyde United. However, no further confirmations was made.

International
Latifu was part of the Nigeria national under-20 football team at the 2007 FIFA U-20 World Cup in Canada and played four games in the tournament.

Latifu was called up to Nigeria national football team on 16 March 2015.

Post-playing career
Settling in Manchester, Latifu became a player agent.

Career statistics

Club

International

Statistics accurate as of match played 29 March 2015

Honours

Club
 Hødd
Norwegian Football Cup (1): 2012

References

External links
 

1989 births
Living people
Nigerian footballers
Nigeria international footballers
Nigeria under-20 international footballers
Association football defenders
Ocean Boys F.C. players
Akwa United F.C. players
Strømsgodset Toppfotball players
IL Hødd players
Aalesunds FK players
Sogndal Fotball players
Mjøndalen IF players
FK Jerv players
Eliteserien players
FC Stal Kamianske players
Norwegian First Division players
Ukrainian Premier League players
Azerbaijan Premier League players
Nemzeti Bajnokság I players
Nigerian expatriate footballers
Alanyaspor footballers
Zira FK players
Budapest Honvéd FC players
Expatriate footballers in Norway
Expatriate footballers in Ukraine
Expatriate footballers in Turkey
Expatriate footballers in Azerbaijan
Expatriate footballers in Hungary
Nigerian expatriate sportspeople in Norway
Nigerian expatriate sportspeople in Turkey
Nigerian expatriate sportspeople in Ukraine
Nigerian expatriate sportspeople in Azerbaijan
Nigerian expatriate sportspeople in Hungary
Bussdor United F.C. players
Hyde United F.C. players
Sportspeople from Kano